Lê Hy Tông (黎熙宗, 22 April 1663 – 4 June 1716) was the 21st emperor of Vietnamese Later Lê dynasty.

Biography
Lê Hy Tông's birth name is Lê Duy Hạp (黎維祫), courtesy name Duy Thịnh (維𥘺). He was born in 1663 and reigned from 1675 to 1705 as emperor, then he was succeeded by his son as Emperor and reigned in 1705–1716 as the Retired Emperor. He was the figurehead king under the power of lord Trịnh Căn who ruled in 1682–1709.

His reign was said to be the prosper period in the Revival Lê dynasty.

Family
He had issue, including two sons : Lê Duy Đường and Lê Duy Chúc.

References

1663 births
1718 deaths
H
Vietnamese retired emperors
Vietnamese monarchs